Siswan is a Community development block and a town in district of Siwan, in Bihar state of India. It is one out of 13 blocks of Siwan Subdivision. The headquarter of the block is at Siswan town.

The block is divided into many Gram Panchayats and villages.

See also
Administration in Bihar

References

Community development blocks in Siwan district